German submarine U-1161 was a Type VIIC U-boat of Nazi Germany's Kriegsmarine during World War II.

She was ordered on 25 August 1941, and was laid down on 27 October 1942 at Danziger Werft AG, Danzig, as yard number 133. She was launched on 8 May 1943 and commissioned under the command of Tenente di vascello Federico De Siervo on 25 August 1943.

Design
German Type VIIC submarines were preceded by the shorter Type VIIB submarines. U-1161 had a displacement of  when at the surface and  while submerged. She had two shafts and two  propellers.

U-1161 was fitted with five  torpedo tubes (four fitted at the bow and one at the stern), fourteen torpedoes or 26 TMA mines, one  SK C/35 naval gun, (220 rounds), one  Flak M42 and two twin  C/30 anti-aircraft guns. The boat had a complement of between 44 — 52 men.

Service history
U-1161 was originally handed over to Italy and renamed S 8 in exchange for transport submarines. However, with Italy's surrender on 8 September 1943 the Kriegsmarine took the boat back over on 10 September 1943 at Gotenhafen and recommissioned her on 27 September 1943.

U-1161 was scuttled near Flensburg, in Kupfermühle Bay, on 5 May 1945, as part of Operation Regenbogen. Her wreck was raised and broken up.

References

Bibliography

External links

German Type VIIC submarines
U-boats commissioned in 1943
World War II submarines of Germany
Ships built in Danzig
1943 ships
Operation Regenbogen (U-boat)
Maritime incidents in May 1945